Pablo Cesar Amaringo Shuña (January 21, 1938 – November 16, 2009) was a Peruvian artist, renowned for his intricate, colourful depictions of his visions from drinking the entheogenic plant brew ayahuasca. He was first brought to the West's attention by Dennis McKenna and Luis Eduardo Luna, who met Pablo in Pucallpa while traveling during work on an ethnobotanical project. Pablo worked as a vegetalista, a shaman in the mestizo tradition of healing, for many years; up to his death, he painted, helped run the Usko-Ayar school of painting, and supervised ayahuasca retreats.

Before dying, he was working on the paintings of angels, as well as paintings documenting the flora and fauna of Peru.

Film 

Pablo's work can be seen in the documentary film Ayahuasca Nature's Greatest Gift.

Book 
When Luna and McKenna met Amaringo in 1985, he was living in poverty, barely surviving by teaching English to young people from his home and selling the odd painting to passing tourists. Luna suggested he paint some of his visions, a project which became the basis of a coauthored book, Ayahuasca Visions: The Religious Iconography of a Peruvian Shaman (North Atlantic Books 1999).

Amaringo occasionally gave interviews in the years following the book's publication, and later penned the preface for Plant Spirit Shamanism: Traditional Techniques for Healing the Soul (Destiny Books 2006). His artwork was featured in Graham Hancock's book "Supernatural". Amaringo also appeared in The Shaman & Ayahuasca: Journeys to Sacred Realms (2010), Michael Wiese's documentary film about ayahuasca.

Death 
After a protracted illness, Amaringo died on November 16, 2009.

See also 
Alex Grey
Guillermo Arévalo
Manuel Córdova-Rios

References 

 ayar 
 Pablo Amaringo at Erowid
 

Psychedelic drug advocates
Shamanism of the Americas
1938 births
2009 deaths
Visionary artists
Peruvian animists
20th-century Peruvian painters
20th-century Peruvian male artists
Latin American artists of indigenous descent
People from Ucayali Region
Peruvian male painters